Gøril Havrevold, (née Egede-Nissen, 11 July 1914 – 17 March 1992) was a Norwegian stage and film actress.

Biography
She was born in Stavanger, Norway; the daughter of Adam Egede-Nissen (1868–1953) and Georga Wilhelma Ellertsen (1871–1959). 
she was the youngest of eleven siblings, seven of whom  were  actors, most of them at the Nationaltheatret. Among her siblings were the actresses Aud Richter (1893–1974),  Gerd Grieg (1895–1988), Ada Kramm (1899–1981), and Lill Egede-Nissen (1909–1962) and the actor Stig Egede-Nissen.

Havrevold made her stage debut at Nationaltheatret in 1932, and worked for this theatre for more than fifty years, acting in a large number of plays. Her film debut was in En glad gutt from 1932, and she also played in Syndere i sommersol from 1934 and in Fant from 1937.

Personal life
She was first married in 1934 to actor Olafr Havrevold (1895–1972). They had two daughters and a son together. She remarried in 1962 to medical doctor Ragnvald Ingebrigtsen (1882–1975), who had previously been married to Gøril's sister Gerd.

Selected filmography
 Sinners in Summertime (1934)

References

External links

1914 births
1992 deaths
Actors from Stavanger
Norwegian stage actresses
Norwegian film actresses
20th-century Norwegian actresses